

The Andrew Carnegie Medals for Excellence in Fiction and Nonfiction were established in 2012 to recognize the best fiction and nonfiction books for adult readers published in the U.S. in the previous year. They are named in honor of nineteenth-century American philanthropist Andrew Carnegie in recognition of his deep belief in the power of books and learning to change the world. The award is supported by the Carnegie Corporation of New York and administered by the American Library Association (ALA). Booklist and the Reference and User Services Association (RUSA) cosponsor the awards. The shortlist and winners are selected by a seven-member selection committee of library experts who work with adult readers. The annually appointed selection committee includes a chair, three Booklist editors or contributors, and three former members of RUSA CODES Notable Books Council.

The winners, one each for fiction and nonfiction, are announced at an event in June at the American Library Association Annual Conference; winning authors receive a $5,000 cash award, and two finalists in each category receive $1,500.

Winners and finalists

Fiction

Nonfiction

Notes
The 2018 Andrew Carnegie Medal for Excellence in Nonfiction was originally awarded to Sherman Alexie for his book, You Don't Have to Say You Love Me: A Memoir, but Alexie declined the award amid sexual harassment allegations. In response, ALA said in a statement that "We acknowledge his decision and will not award the Carnegie nonfiction medal in 2018."

References

External links
Andrew Carnegie Medals for Excellence in Fiction & Nonfiction – official website

2012 establishments in the United States
Awards established in 2012
American Library Association awards
American fiction awards
American non-fiction literary awards
English-language literary awards